The 2020 Tour of Romania was a six-day cycling stage race that took place in Romania from 8 to 13 September. The race was the 53rd edition of the Tour of Romania. The tour was rated as a 2.2 event, as part of the 2020 UCI Europe Tour.

Teams 
Five UCI Continental teams, three domestic teams, and three national teams made up the eleven teams that participated in the race. Five teams (Bulgaria, CSA Steaua București, and ) entered seven riders each, while two teams entered six ( and UVT-Devron West Cycling Team), five ( and Romania), and four (Moldova and Olimpic Torpedo Zărnești) each per team.  withdrew shortly before the race. 56 of the 65 riders in the race finished.

UCI Continental Teams

 
 
 
 
 
 

Domestic Teams

 CSA Steaua București
 Olimpic Torpedo Zărnești
 UVT-Devron West Cycling Team

National Teams

 Bulgaria
 Moldova
 Romania

Route

Stages

Prologue 
8 September 2020 — Timișoara,  (ITT)

Stage 1 
9 September 2020 — Timișoara to Oradea,

Stage 2 
10 September 2020 — Oradea to Cluj-Napoca,

Stage 3 
11 September 2020 — Târgu Mureș to Lake Sfânta Ana,

Stage 4 
12 September 2020 — Cârțișoara to Curtea de Argeș,

Stage 5 
13 September 2020 — Bucharest,

Classification leadership table

Final classification standings

General classification

Mountains classification

Sprints classification

Young rider classification

Romanian rider classification

Team classification

See also 

 2020 in men's road cycling
 2020 in sports

References

External links 
 

2020 UCI Europe Tour
2020
Tour of Romania
Tour of Romania